Noir is the second studio album by the South Korean boy group B.A.P.  It was released on November 7, 2016, under the label of TS Entertainment. "Skydive" was used as the lead single.

Track listing

Promotion 
Promotions for the album started on November 11, 2016, at Mnet's M Countdown and continued onto KBS2's Music Bank, MBC's Show! Music Core, SBS's Inkigayo, SBS MTV's The Show, and MBC Music's Show Champion.

Other news
Bang Yong-guk, the leader of B.A.P, took a hiatus from musical activities and did not participate in the promotions of this album due to health reasons.

Charts

Awards and nominations

Music program awards

Release history

References

2016 albums
B.A.P (South Korean band) albums
Kakao M albums
TS Entertainment albums